San Pasqual High School may refer to one of the following:

San Pasqual High School (Escondido, California), U.S.
San Pasqual Valley High School, Winterhaven, California, U.S.